Calcium bicarbonate, also called calcium hydrogencarbonate, has the chemical formula Ca(HCO3)2. The term does not refer to a known solid compound; it exists only in aqueous solution containing calcium (Ca2+), bicarbonate, and carbonate ions, together with dissolved carbon dioxide (CO2). The relative concentrations of these carbon-containing species depend on the pH; bicarbonate predominates within the range 6.36–10.25 in fresh water.

All waters in contact with the atmosphere absorb carbon dioxide, and as these waters come into contact with rocks and sediments they acquire metal ions, most commonly calcium and magnesium, so most natural waters that come from streams, lakes, and especially wells, can be regarded as dilute solutions of these bicarbonates.   These hard waters tend to form carbonate scale in pipes and boilers and they react with soaps to form an undesirable scum.

Attempts to prepare compounds such as solid calcium bicarbonate by evaporating its solution to dryness invariably yield instead the solid calcium carbonate:
Ca(HCO3)2(aq) → CO2(g)  +  H2O(l)  +  CaCO3(s).
Very few solid bicarbonates other than those of the alkali metals (other than ammonium bicarbonate) are known to exist.

The above reaction is very important to the formation of stalactites, stalagmites, columns, and other speleothems within caves, and for that matter, in the formation of the caves themselves.  As water containing carbon dioxide (including extra CO2 acquired from soil organisms) passes through limestone or other calcium carbonate-containing minerals, it dissolves part of the calcium carbonate,  hence becomes richer in bicarbonate.  As the groundwater enters the cave, the excess carbon dioxide is released from the solution of the bicarbonate, causing the much less soluble calcium carbonate to be deposited.

In the reverse process, dissolved carbon dioxide (CO2) in rainwater (H2O) reacts with limestone calcium carbonate (CaCO3) to form soluble calcium bicarbonate (Ca(HCO3)2). This soluble compound is then washed away with the rainwater. This form of weathering is called carbonation.

In medicine, calcium bicarbonate is sometimes administered intravenously to immediately correct the cardiac depressor effects of hyperkalemia by increasing calcium concentration in serum, and at the same time, correcting the acid usually present.

References 

Bicarbonates
Acid salts
Calcium compounds